The Albany Theatre is a multi-purpose arts centre in Coventry, West Midlands.

The college building theatre, known to its regulars as the Butts Theatre, closed in January 2009, following the acquisition of the (then-named) City College site by developers.

For years its future had been in doubt, but it re-opened on 1 February 2013. The council's intervention – requiring the site owners to retain and support the renamed Albany Theatre for at least 25 years through the creation of a charitable trust – made it possible for volunteers to undertake a considerable amount of work revamping, replacing and renovating services and facilities.

Adam Durnin was appointed as Theatre Manager in June 2014 to lead the Albany's development through its next stages. Once again, the organisation hit a "glass ceiling". Whilst the number of events that could be supported had grown, the theatre was inevitably operating below its potential. In late 2016, a team of 8 part-time staff, supported by 4 apprentices, was recruited to manage the theatre day to day and lead a growing team of volunteers. Over the next three years part-time posts became full time, and in January 2020 Kevin Shaw joined the Albany as CEO and artistic director.

Facilities include an art-deco style theatre, seating up to 620 (515 stalls, 120 balcony). The Albany Theatre currently hosts a varied programme of events including music, theatre and children's shows.

2020 has been an exceptionally difficult year because of the COVID-19 restrictions, but the Albany has survived and is poised to move forward with the announcement of funding for significant development plans, for which planning permission was granted in November 2020.

History 
The building that is the Albany Theatre main house was originally built and used as a lecture theatre. Called the Great Hall, it sat at the heart of Coventry Technical College, which opened in 1935.

Coventry 's new Technical Institute was opened in 1888 in an old textile warehouse in Earl Street which David Spencer had dedicated to the City Council on the condition that it should be used for technical schools and a school of science. Local industry was responsible for supplying the major equipment needed for these courses, often free of charge, and The American Writing Machine Company loaned typewriters to the commercial department until 1893.

The institute's Earl Street buildings were never really fully suitable for use, and so in the early 1900s, plans were drawn up to flatten the building and build a new one on the same site, but this proved to be too expensive. Various other sites were considered and Pool Meadow was selected. However, with the outbreak of the First World War, no further progress could be made.

In 1919, the city council acquired three acres of land at the corner of Albany Road and Butts as a site for the new building (bringing together the Junior Technical School, providing apprenticeships for boys who were not academic enough for the National Diploma, and the institute).

The name Butts comes from when the land was used by archers for practice (Edward IV having passed a law in 1477 – never repealed – making it compulsory for all males to own a longbow and to practice on Sundays after church. Butts are mounds of earth along which the archers could shoot.

In 1926 the Institute qualified as a Technical College and changed its name accordingly – free from fees for children aged 5–11 and a senior school for over 11s. Coventry led the country in day release apprenticeships with 500 registered in 1931. The institute was now providing courses for every level up to final honours degree.

Work began on the building of the new college in August 1933, and a time capsule (messages in a bottle) was buried under the front steps by the workmen – this was later discovered in 1995.

On 10 July 1934, HRH the Prince of Wales visited the building under construction. The college was formally opened on 10 December 1935 by the Duke of York (later George VI).

During the Second World War, trenches were dug in the sports ground and special courses were run in fuel efficiency, economical bread production and the making of wartime gym shoes. The iron railings at the front (which had cost £600) were almost all lost to the War effort and the nation's need for scrap iron for a paltry £30. The college never closed during this time and after the heavy bombing in November 1940, hundreds of homeless citizens were housed at the college. A number of bombs were dropped on the building, but it escaped with little damage.

The Council for the Encouragement of Music and the Arts used the Theatre through the War Years to entertain the public with concerts and other events.

After the war, the college or Butts Theatre entered something of a golden age. The archive shows how well it was used, not only by community groups, but also as a professional venue. It was home to the Midland Theatre Company – the first funded (and well-supported) "Rep". The Midland Theatre Company went on to become the repertory company at the Belgrade.

Workers at car factories like Morris Motors organised amateur play performances; arts societies organised drama competitions; musical theatre societies thrived; dance companies and schools used it well, as did of course students studying at the college. The theatre is mentioned in "The Art of Coarse Acting" from when it was home to several drama festivals. Some of the city's biggest stars began their careers at the theatre; most importantly, thousands of young people had their first taste of performance there, which explains the passionate nostalgia for a bygone age and support for a vibrant future.

The theatre underwent major refurbishment in the late 1980s with the construction of a counterweight flying frame and powered flying winches as well as a major electrical rewire of the stage lighting, financed by Coventry City Council. But then the future of the building as a theatre came under significant threat during the 1990s.

As Carol Bloxham notes, in her 2008 history of the college, the Technical College faced acute financial pressures, attributed to the inability of College Management to manage the budget that was handed to them when colleges were taken out of local authority control. When in 1991 it came to light that the Technical College had lost somewhere in the region of £3 million in its accounts, the Principal, John Temple, who had been in office since 1984, resigned along with members of the senior management team. Keith Wood, then Theatre Manager, fought a determined battle, strongly supported by local amateur groups, to prevent the theatre from conversion to premises to house "new-fangled" computer suites. Although Arts Council England awarded a substantial lottery grant in 1997 (£365,000) for the "Refurbishment of Community Theatre" the threat to the theatre's survival was real and constant.

The passion of the campaign to save it, led by Alan Biddle and Coventry Musical Theatre Consortium, persuaded the City Council to impose a "Section 106" planning condition when the college building was finally sold to developers that aimed to ensure the theatre would be saved for the community. When Coventry Technical College – then known as City College – moved its final students across the city at the end of 2008 the theatre closed its doors and went dark.

THE BIRTH OF THE ALBANY THEATRE

The S106 required the site's new owners (and successors in title) to establish "the Butts Theatre Trust" (a charitable trust that would operate the re-opened Theatre) "as soon as is reasonably practical" following the appointment of a "Theatre Development Manager".

Once established, the Trust set about bringing the theatre building back to life. Allowed access in June 2012, a small army of volunteers (many who had been involved in the campaign to save the theatre) planned and carried out restitution, repairs and developments. An estimated £100,000 of time and donated materials, supported by residual grant funding of around £50,000 from Coventry City Council, led to a formal re-opening of the auditorium on 1 February 2013.

For over 12 months, the theatre was entirely volunteer-led and managed. A full-time, paid Theatre manager was employed in June 2014.

References 

Companies
Coventry